Leila Mottley (born 2002) is an American novelist and poet. She is The New York Times bestselling author of Nightcrawling, an Oprah's Book Club pick.

Early life 
Mottley was born and raised in Oakland, California, where she continues to reside. She dropped out of Smith College.

Career 
Mottley was named the Youth Poet Laureate of Oakland, California in 2018 at age 16, having served the prior year as Vice Youth Poet Laureate. Her poetry has appeared in The New York Times.

Mottley co-wrote and starred in a documentary short, When I Write It, an official selection of the Tribeca Film Festival in 2020.

In June 2022, Mottley published her first novel, Nightcrawling.  Nightcrawling was longlisted for the Booker Prize on July 26, 2022.

References 

21st-century American poets
Living people
2002 births
Smith College alumni
Novelists from California
Poets from California
Writers from Oakland, California
American women poets
21st-century American novelists
American women novelists